Rembert George Samuel Weakland  (April 2, 1927 – August 22, 2022) was an American Roman Catholic bishop and Benedictine monk who served as Archbishop of Milwaukee from 1977 to 2002. 

Shortly before his retirement, it was revealed that Weakland had a sexual relationship with a seminarian several decades before and that the diocese had paid $450,000 to the man to settle litigation.

Biography

Early life 
George Weakland was born on April 2, 1927, in Patton, Pennsylvania, to Basil Weakland (1897–1932) and Mary Kane (1898–1978). He had four sisters: Leora, Elizabeth, Barbara, and Marian; and a brother William. Weakland attended Our Lady of Perpetual Help School in Patton, Illinois, and then enrolled at the minor seminary run by the Benedictine monks of Saint Vincent Archabbey in Latrobe, Pennsylvania.

In 1945, Weakland entered the novitiate of the archabbey, taking the religious name of Rembert. On September 23, 1946, he went on to study at Saint Vincent College and Saint Vincent Seminary, also run by the archabbey. He made his solemn profession as a monk on September 29, 1949, at Solesmes Abbey in France. Weakland was then sent by the archabbot to study theology at the Pontifical Atheneum of St. Anselm in Rome.

Priesthood 
On June 24, 1951, Weakland was ordained to the priesthood for the Benedictine order by Bishop Simone Salvi, the abbot of Subiaco Abbey near Rome, Italy. He furthered his studies in music in Italy, France, and Germany, as well as at the Juilliard School and Columbia University, both in New York City. 

While researching at the British Library in London, Weakland discovered the text of a medieval liturgical drama, the Play of Daniel. He then released an authoritative text with commentary. The drama was frequently staged by musical groups, such as the New York Pro Musica. From 1957 to 1963, Weakland taught music at St. Vincent College.

Archabbot and abbot primate 
Weakland was elected coadjutor archabbot of St. Vincent Archabbey on June 26, 1963. He soon succeeded to the office and received the solemn blessing of an archabbot from Bishop William G. Connare of the Diocese of Greensburg, on August 29, 1963. Following this, Weakland became chancellor and then chair of the board for the college. On May 8, 1964, he received a papal appointment as consultor to the Commission for Implementing the Constitution on the Sacred Liturgy of the Second Vatican Council and was appointed a member of that commission in 1968.

On September 29, 1967, Weakland was elected the abbot primate of the Benedictine Confederation, to which office he was later re-elected in 1973. During this period, he served as chancellor ex officio of the Pontifical Atheneum of St. Anselm. He also served as a member of the Vatican Council of Superiors General from 1968 until 1977. In 1968, Weakland presided over an international, inter-religious monastic conference near Bangkok, Thailand, at which the American Trappist monk and writer, Thomas Merton, died. Weakland administered the Last Rites of the Catholic Church to Merton and arranged for the body to be flown back on a U.S. military airplane to the United States.

Archbishop of Milwaukee
On September 20, 1977, Pope Paul VI appointed Weakland as archbishop of the Archdiocese of Milwaukee. He was consecrated on November 8, in the Cathedral of St. John the Evangelist in Milwaukee by Archbishop Jean Jadot. One of Weakland's first actions was to sell the four bedroom suburban home where his predecessor had lived and move to the cathedral rectory.<ref>[http://old.post-gazette.com/nation/20020525weakland0525p3.asp Rodgers-Melnick, Ann. "Archbishop escaped poverty to become leading liberal Catholic voice", Pittsburgh Post-Gazette, May 25, 2002]</ref>

Weakland's tenure was divisive due to his pronounced liberal views and liturgical experiments. While unapproachable for some and jarring in his coverups for abusive priests, he also sought to reach Catholics on the margins of church and society. He gave support for the Milwaukee AIDS Project. Amidst abortion controversies, Weakland participated in public "listening sessions", encouraging Catholic women to share their views on the issue.

On December 21, 1999, Weakland received a doctorate in musicology – "with distinction" – from Columbia University, for his thesis on "The Office Antiphons of the Ambrosian Chant". 

 Retirement and legacy 
On May 24, 2002, Pope John Paul II accepted Weakland's resignation as archbishop of the Archdiocese of Milwaukee. His retirement was overshadowed by revelation of a large payout to prevent a lawsuit. The archdiocese had paid $450,000 to Paul Marcoux, a former seminarian studying at Marquette University, to settle a claim he made against the archbishop more than two decades earlier stemming from a long-term relationship with Weakland. Weakland admitted to the affair and apologized after the story broke. 

Following his retirement, Weakland twice announced he was moving to a Benedictine abbey – his former home at St. Vincent Archabbey, then to St. Mary's Abbey in Newark New Jersey. However, the Benedictines rescinded both invitations. In 2009, Weakland announced that he was gay in his memoir A Pilgrim in a Pilgrim Church: Memoirs of a Catholic Archbishop.

In March 2019, the archdiocese announced that it was removing Weakland's name from buildings in the archdiocese. The Weakland Center, which houses parish offices and outreach initiatives, was renamed on March 22, 2019.

In his later years, Weakland was in poor health, being in hospice care in his condo in Milwaukee. He Weakland died on August 22, 2022, at his residence in Greenfield, Wisconsin, following a long illness. A public Mass of Christian Burial was offered by Archbishop Jerome Listecki at the Cathedral of St. John the Evangelist on August 30, 2022.  Weakland's remains were interred at the cemetery of St. Vincent Archabbey on September 1, 2022.

Public controversies

Sexual abuse scandal

In 1984, Weakland responded to teachers in a Catholic school who were reporting sexual abuse by local priests by stating "any libelous material found in your letter will be scrutinized carefully by our lawyers". The Wisconsin Court of Appeals rebuked him for this, calling his remarks "abrupt" and "insensitive". In 1994, Weakland said those reporting sexual abuse were "squealing". He later apologized for the remarks.

According to the Milwaukee Journal Sentinel, a deposition released in 2009 revealed that Weakland shredded reports about sexual abuse by priests. Weakland admitted allowing priests guilty of child sex abuse to continue in ministry without warning parishioners or alerting the police. He stated in his autobiography that in the early years of the sexual abuse scandal he did not understand that child sexual abuse was a crime.

Liturgical agenda
In 1965 to 1966, Weakland served as president of the Church Music Association of America. According to an account by Richard Schuler, a split emerged very quickly, with Weakland taking sharp exception to the "reactionary attitudes in liturgical thinking" that he said were present at the Consociato meeting. In interviews with the press, he expressed regret that the meeting failed to include modern music and dancing in its liturgical agenda. His views did not prevail within the CMAA and so his presidency did not last.

In 2000, Weakland was a critic of the Congregation for the Doctrine of the Faith's document Dominus Iesus'' on religious relativism. One of his last major actions as archbishop was effecting a controversial renovation of the Cathedral of St. John the Evangelist.

Removal of name from Archdiocese of Milwaukee

See also

 Catholic Church hierarchy
 Catholic Church in the United States
 Historical list of the Catholic bishops of the United States
 List of Catholic bishops of the United States
 Lists of popes, patriarchs, primates, archbishops, and bishops
 Roman Catholic Archdiocese of Milwaukee

References

External links 
 Archbishop Rembert Weakland at the Archdiocese of Milwaukee website
 
 Archdiocese of Milwaukee

1927 births
2022 deaths
People from Cambria County, Pennsylvania
American Benedictines
Saint Vincent College alumni
Pontifical Atheneum of St. Anselm alumni
Columbia University alumni
Abbots Primate
20th-century Roman Catholic archbishops in the United States
21st-century Roman Catholic archbishops in the United States
Roman Catholic archbishops of Milwaukee
Benedictine bishops
Writers from Pennsylvania
Writers from Milwaukee
Catholics from Pennsylvania
LGBT bishops
LGBT Roman Catholic clergy
LGBT people from Pennsylvania